The Misema Caldera is a 2,704-2,707 million year old caldera in Ontario and Quebec, Canada.

Geographic extent 
It is the caldera that forms the Blake River Megacaldera Complex and has a diameter of 40-80 kilometres.

Composition 
The caldera is also a coalescence of at least two large mafic shield volcanoes that formed more than 2703 million years ago. The rim of the Misema Caldera contains a 10-15 kilometre wide inner and outer ring zone, in which many mafic ring dike complexes and subaqueous pyroclastic sediments are detected.

The mafic ring dike structures may be deeper level expressions of summit calderas related to a shield volcano phase while the pyroclastic fragments could either be associated with satellite cones or the result of Misema caldera collapse.

The Misema Caldera is the oldest and largest caldera associated with the Blake River Megacaldera Complex and is comparable in size to the Lake Toba caldera in Indonesia.

See also
New Senator Caldera
Noranda Caldera
List of volcanoes in Canada
Volcanism of Canada
Volcanism of Eastern Canada

References

Calderas of Ontario
Calderas of Quebec
Shield volcanoes
Supervolcanoes
VEI-8 volcanoes
Archean calderas
Polygenetic volcanoes
Landforms of Abitibi-Témiscamingue